Highway 358 is a highway in the Canadian province of Saskatchewan. It runs from Highway 18 near Wood Mountain to Highway 13 near Limerick.

Highway 358 passes through the communities of Flintoff and Lakenheath. It skirts the western shore of Twelve Mile Lake about halfway between its southern and northern terminuses.

References

358